The South Florida Bulls volleyball team represents the University of South Florida in the sport of women's volleyball. The Bulls compete in the American Athletic Conference of NCAA Division I. The team plays their home games at The Corral inside the Yuengling Center on USF's campus in Tampa, Florida. They are coached by Jolene Shepardson who was hired after the 2019 season. The Bulls have reached seven NCAA women's volleyball tournaments and won a combined 18 regular season and tournament conference championships in their history, the most of any women's team at USF.

History 
Like many women's sports teams in colleges across the country, the USF women's volleyball team was founded in 1972 after the passing of Title IX. The NCAA did not sponsor women's sports at the time, so the Lady Brahmans as they were known until 1987 played in the Association for Intercollegiate Athletics for Women (AIAW) Small College Division (equivalent to NCAA Division II) for their first year and the AIAW Large College Division (equivalent to NCAA Division I) from 1973 until the association dissolved after the spring of 1982.

The Brahmans played as independents as members of the AIAW, as well as during their first year in the National Collegiate Athletic Association (NCAA). They joined USF's men's teams in the Sun Belt Conference before their 1983 season, and they won their first conference championship that year.

The program was very successful in the years directly after they joined the NCAA. In the first 21 seasons after the AIAW's collapse, USF won all of their 11 regular season conference titles and seven conference tournaments, as well as making each of their seven NCAA women's volleyball tournament appearances. They have also made the National Invitational Volleyball Championship (formerly called the Women's Invitational Volleyball Championship) three times, including a quarterfinal appearance in 1994.

In 1995 the team moved from the old USF Gymnasium, where it had called home since the team was founded in 1972, to The Corral, a volleyball-specific area within the Yuengling Center with a capacity of about 1,000. The Bulls also play some home games on the main floor of the Yuengling Center (used for the men's and women's basketball teams), particularly rivalry games and games against ranked opponents.

The Bulls have not seen much success recently and have not won a conference championship or reached the NCAA Tournament since 2002.

Season by season results

USF Athletic Hall of Fame 
Two former volleyball players are members of the University of South Florida Athletic Hall of Fame. Michelle Collier played from 1998 to 2002, owns seven school records, and has her number 10 jersey hanging from the rafters in The Corral. She was inducted in 2011. Erika Berggren played from 1993–96 and was named conference player of the year twice. She was inducted in 2022.

Media 
Under the current American Athletic Conference TV deal, all home and in-conference away volleyball games are shown on one of the various ESPN networks or streamed live on ESPN+. Live radio broadcasts of games are also available nationwide for free on the Bulls Unlimited digital radio station on TuneIn.

See also 

 University of South Florida
 South Florida Bulls
 South Florida Bulls beach volleyball

References 

volleyball